The IAI I-View (Eye-View in some sources) is a small reconnaissance unmanned aerial vehicle developed in Israel in the early 21st century. Like other UAVs produced by IAI, it has fixed landing gear and an 18.6 kW (25 hp) piston engine. The Eye-View is also being promoted in civilian markets for forest fire warning, and in this form is appropriately known as the FireBird.

In December 2006, the I-View was selected as the winning tender in the JP129 requirement to provide a reconnaissance UAV for the Australian Defence Force. The contract for the project was canceled in September 2008 as a result of technical problems before any UAVs were delivered.

Under a $50 million deal, signed in April, Israel Aerospace Industries (IAI) will supply Russia with some of its second-tier UAVs, including the Bird-Eye 400 mini-UAV, the I-view MK150 tactical UAV and the Searcher Mk II medium-range UAV. This is the first Israeli sale of military platforms to Russia.

Specifications

References

This article contains material that originally came from the web article Unmanned Aerial Vehicles by Greg Goebel, which exists in the Public Domain.

2000s Israeli military reconnaissance aircraft
IAI unmanned aerial vehicles
V-tail aircraft